Xalan is a popular open source software library from the Apache Software Foundation, that implements the XSLT 1.0 XML transformation language and the XPath 1.0 language. The Xalan XSLT processor is available for both the Java and C++ programming languages. It combines technology from two main sources: an XSLT processor originally created by IBM under the name LotusXSL, and an XSLT compiler created by Sun Microsystems under the name XSLTC. A wrapper for the Eiffel language is available.

See also
 Java XML
 Apache Xerces
 libxml2
 Saxon XSLT

References

External links
 Xalan Home page

Xalan
Java (programming language) libraries
Java platform
Software using the Apache license
XSLT processors